This article is for list of mosques in Hungary

 Tomb of Gül Baba (Budapest) (only a tomb, doesn't serve as a mosque); 
 Mosque of Pasha Qasim (Pécs) (converted to a Roman Catholic church);
 Yakovalı Hasan Paşa Mosque or Mosque of Pasha Jacowali Hassan (Pécs);
 Malkocs Bey Mosque (Siklós);
 Eger minaret (only the minaret remains. Minaret of the Djami of Kethuda mosque. Not in religious use anymore);
 Ozijeli Haji Ibrahim Mosque (Esztergom)(not in religious use);
 Budapest Mosque of the Hungarian Muslims' Church (Kelenföld, Budapest)

See also 
 Islam in Hungary
 Religion in Hungary

 
Hungary
Mosques